Cygnus OB2 #8A is a double-lined spectroscopic binary located near the centre of the Cygnus OB2 association located 5,500 light years away.

Discovery
Until 1951 Cyg OB2 #8 had been known only as an anonymous catalogue entry in the Bonner Durchmusterung.  Then it was identified as one of several highly luminous hot stars close together in Cygnus.  Despite being commonly referred to as Schulte #8A, the number 8 was first published in an earlier paper.  Schulte identified the grouping as a massive stellar association and split star #8 into four components, including #8A.

System
The Cygnus OB2 #8A system contains two massive luminous O class stars in a 21.9 day orbit.  The primary is a  supergiant and the secondary is a  giant star.  The two stars are not thought to be exchanging mass and their luminosity classes match the main sequence turnoff in the Cyg OB2 association at around O6.  The nearby stars Cyg OB2 #8B, #8C, and #8D, originally thought to be a single star, are all massive and luminous class O stars.

References

External links
 

Cygnus (constellation)
Emission-line stars
Astronomical X-ray sources
O-type giants
BD+40 4227
101425
O-type supergiants
Spectroscopic binaries
J20331508+4118504